Lompoquia retropes is an extinct genus of ray-finned fishes belonging to the family Sciaenidae, the drums. These fishes lived what is now Southern California during the Upper Miocene subepoch.

Species
Two species are classified within this genus:

 means extinct

See also

 Prehistoric fish
 List of prehistoric bony fish

References

Sciaenidae
Miocene fish
Miocene fish of North America
Prehistoric perciform genera
Taxa named by David Starr Jordan